Heinrich Wenseler (26 March 1891 – 13 September 1943) was a German track and field athlete who competed in the 1912 Summer Olympics. In 1912 he was eliminated in the first round of the 400 metres competition.

References

External links
list of German athletes
Heinrich Wenseler's profile at Sports Reference.com

1891 births
1943 deaths
German male sprinters
Olympic athletes of Germany
Athletes (track and field) at the 1912 Summer Olympics